The International School of Qingdao, colloquially known as ISQ, is a private, independent, co-educational, tuition-based international school located in Qingdao, China, serving the city's expatriate community and educating children age 3 through 12th grade. A North American, college preparatory curriculum is offered with English as the language of instruction.

Founded in 1996 with eight students, enrollment has steadily increased, reaching over 300 students by 2018. That year, the student body was 49% Korean, 23% American, 6%, Canadian, 2% Australian, 1% French, and 19% other. A total of twenty countries were represented.

ISQ is part of the International Schools Consortium (iSC), which serves more than 2,000 students, most of whom are the children of foreign nationals and expatriates working for companies in China.

History
The International School of Qingdao (ISQ), formerly known as QMIS (Qingdao MTI International School), was established by International Schools Consortium (iSC), a non-profit corporation committed to educational work in China. This includes establishing international schools for expatriate children and promoting cultural understanding and exchanges. ISQ was the second of seven schools to be established under the International Schools Consortium. ISQ obtained licensing from the Qingdao Education Commission in June 1996 and the National Education Ministry on September 23, 1996.

When ISQ began in the fall of 1996, there were eight students in kindergarten through fourth grade. The school was housed in three classrooms with an office and restrooms on the second floor of the back wing of the No. 1 Middle School of High Tech Park. The school grew to thirteen students by the end of the first academic year, and by the end of the second year, the growing student population necessitated that the school relocated. In August 1998, ISQ moved to the fourth floor of the Children's Club at the Qingdao Children's Activity Center, No. 6 Donghai Road. The steady increase in enrollment required the school once more to acquire more classroom and office space at the activity center.

Because of its continued growth, ISQ again relocated to a larger campus. ISQ started its 2007–2008 academic year on a new campus in the Laoshan district. The school's current campus is located in the Licang district of Qingdao, at No. 26 Tianshui Lu. The school moved to this new campus in 2017.

Timeline
1996
QMIS* is founded by the non-profit Management Technologies International (MTI)
June 1996
QMIS receives its licensing from Qingdao Education Commission
September 1996
QMIS receives its licensing from the National Education Ministry
Summer 1998
QMIS moves to a campus at the Qingdao Children's Activity Center
Summer 2007
QMIS moves to a larger campus in the Laoshan district. They shared the campus with Baishan School.
Summer 2010
QMIS changes its name to "International School of Qingdao", or ISQ.
Summer 2017
ISQ moves to a new campus in the Licang district.
ISQ renews its WASC accreditation

*ISQ was known as QMIS until the 2010–11 school year.

Campus
ISQ began the 2017–2018 academic year on a new campus in the Licang District. It is the only international school in Qingdao with its own campus. The new facility boasts over 50 classrooms, an auditorium, two playgrounds, a soccer field, a computer lab, a basketball /volleyball court, and a library.

Previous campuses 
ISQ has had three previous campuses. The first was at No. 1 Middle School of High Tech Park where ISQ used only three classrooms, some office space, and a set of restrooms. The second was at the Children's Club at the Qingdao Children's Activity Center, No. 6 Donghai Road. Throughout their time there, the school would acquire more space as needed. The third campus was at Baishan School in the Laoshan District. While a much larger and more accommodating campus, ISQ shared the space with Baishan School, the boarding school that owned the property. The Baishan campus boasted a soccer field, a smaller soccer field, a track, an outdoor stage, two playgrounds, a gym, an auditorium, a cafeteria, a kiln, two computer labs, two libraries, and a pool.

Faculty and staff
ISQ has over 70 faculty and staff members from ten different countries, which include the United States, the United Kingdom, Canada, South Korea, and South Africa. The average tenure for teachers at ISQ is 6.5 years and 49% of the faculty have a master's degree or higher. Some pursue a master's while teaching.

Student body and class size

Student body 
Since its establishment, ISQ's students have come from a wide variety of countries, including India, the United States, Canada, South Korea, Japan, United Kingdom, Denmark, Sweden, Germany, Italy, Switzerland, Austria, France, Greece, Singapore, Russia, Philippines, and New Zealand.

Class size 
The class sizes at ISQ are set as follows: 
 Pre-kindergarten - 14,
 Junior-kindergarten - 16
 Kindergarten - 18
 First-fifth - 24
 Sixth-twelfth - 25
 ESL - 16

Curriculum overview

English 
All students in grades 1-8 take basic English classes. Students begin with focuses on spelling and grammar, then transition to reading novels and writing essays as they approach high school. High school students are required to have four credits of English. In additional to standard high school English classes, the school offers two AP English classes: Lit and Lang, with each being offered every other year.

ELL 
Students who are new to the English language are required to take ELL in place of taking English class and foreign language with the rest of their grade. This is offered for students in grades 1–8. By high school, a student's English level must be sufficient enough for them to join regular English classes.

Foreign language 
All students in grades 1-8 are required to study Chinese. The only exception is ELL students, who also take ELL classes in place of foreign language. In elementary, there are five levels of Chinese. In middle school, there are  five levels of Chinese. In high school, students must obtain two credits of a foreign language. ISQ previously offered Spanish, but now only offers Chinese and Korean. AP Chinese is offered, and Honors Chinese (for native speakers) is offered and considered the hardest Chinese course that ISQ offers (this is noted on a student's transcript). In addition to these Chinese courses, Beginner Chinese, Intermediate Chinese, and Advanced Chinese are also offered. A passing score on the AP Chinese exam in addition to passing the class counts as two credits.

Mathematics 
Students in elementary study traditional elementary math. In middle school, students begin with either math 6 or pre-algebra (depending on where they place on an evaluation exam) and by 8th grade will have progressed to either algebra I or geometry. In high school, students begin their freshmen year with either geometry or algebra II. For older high school students, pre-calculus, honors pre-calculus, AP Calculus AB, AP Calculus BC, AP Statistics, Intro to statistics, and advanced calculus are offered. Intro Statistics is not offered every year, and Advanced Calculus is considered the hardest math course that ISQ offers (this is noted on a student's transcript).

Physical education / health 
Students in grades 1-8  are required to take a general physical education class. Middler school also requires  some variation of a traditional health class every year. In high school, a total of two credits are required (0.5 for Health, and 1.5 for Physical Education), though the two classes have become somewhat integrated. Students have the option to obtain Physical Education credits through after-school athletics. 0.5 credits are earned if a students participates in three junior varsity sports in one school year, and 0.5 credits are earned if a student makes two varsity sports in one school year. A student can earn a whole credit if three varsity sports are achieved in one school year.

Science 
Middle school students take a combination of integrated sciences – life, earth, and physical. For high school students, 3 credits of science are required, and biology and chemistry are mandatory (to be taken in the Freshmen and Sophomore year respectively). Physics is optional for upperclassmen, in addition to optional AP Bio, AP Chem, and AP Physics 1. Sophomores may take AP Bio. AP Physics can also count for a student's math credit under certain conditions. The schools also offers AP CSP and AP CSA, with one being offered every other year.

Social studies 
The middle school social studies curriculum includes a very entry-level study of world history and geography. High school students must complete three credits of Social Studies, and one must be either AP Economics or economics/government. For freshmen, world history is required. Other high school students may choose between AP World History, AP Macroeconomics, contemporary history/culture, science, and identity, AP Psychology, or AP Human Geography.

Fine arts 
Students in elementary take art and music classes. In middle school, students are offered the choice of art, band, choir, drama, or drama tech, among other electives. In high school, students are required to obtain one art credit before graduating. ISQ previously offered AP Art History, but now only offers traditional art classes and digital media classes. Theater and theater tech are options for high school students.

AP courses / honors courses 
ISQ currently offers AP Calculus AB, AP Calculus BC, AP Biology, AP Chemistry, AP Statistics, AP World History, AP Macroeconomics, AP Chinese, AP English Literature, AP English Language, AP Computer Science Principles, AP Computer Science A, AP Seminar, and AP Research. AP Language and AP Literature are each offered every other year, and the same applies to the AP Computer Science classes. ISQ formerly offered AP Art History. [[

Advanced placement courses have been designed to provide an additional challenge for students wishing to learn more about a specific subject area. Courses are taught at the level of a university freshman course. Students will receive 0.66 additional grade points for grades of C− or higher. Students in AP classes receive more homework than they would receive in an honors course. Students taking AP courses are eligible to take College Board exams. Charges for this test are paid by the school. However, if a student chooses to take an AP test but is not in that AP course, they must pay the exam fee. AP courses require more homework than regular classes. Whereas a regular course requires an average of 2.5 hours of homework per week, AP courses require approximately 6 hours per week.

Due to the rigorous requirements, ISQ has set limits on the amount of AP courses a student may take. Freshmen are only permitted to take AP Chinese, and only if they pass an entrance exam designed by ISQ's Chinese Department. Sophomores may choose between AP Bio, AP Stat, AP Econ, AP Chinese, AP World, and whichever of the two computer science courses the school is offering that year. They can only chose two. Under special circumstances, a sophomore may be permitted to take an AP Calc course. Upperclassmen are permitted to take any and all AP Courses, but only three per year. Under special circumstances, a student may take five, but only if they can keep all their individual class grades above 97%.

Honors courses are also more rigorous and place higher demands on students. Students who take honors courses receive 0.33 additional grade points for grades of C− or higher. Unlike AP courses, honors courses are not subject to outside exams, and students are unable to use honors courses to apply for college credit.

Student life 
Students in high school enjoy friendly grade competitions.

Grading scale and GPA
The GPA scale used by the International School of Qingdao depends on the grade percentage attained in each class.

References

External links

 Official website

International schools in China